Tselemt (Amharic: ጸለምት) is one of the woredas in the Amhara Region of Ethiopia. Located at the northeastern point of the Semien Gondar Zone, Tselemt is bordered on the south by Beyeda, on the southwest by Jan Amora, on the west by Addi Arkay, and on the north and east by the Tigray Region. Tselemt was part of Addi Arkay woreda.

Demographics
Based on the 2007 national census conducted by the Central Statistical Agency of Ethiopia (CSA), this woreda has a total population of 57,241, of whom 28,711 are men and 28,530 women; none of the population were urban inhabitants. The majority of the inhabitants practiced Ethiopian Orthodox Christianity, with 97.9% reporting that as their religion, while 2.1% of the population said they were Muslim.

Notes

Districts of Amhara Region